The 2011 season was Bolívar's 34th competitive season in the Liga de Fútbol Profesional Boliviano, and 87th year in existence as a football club.

Squad
For Liga de Fútbol Profesional Boliviano 2011

Transfers in

Transfers out

First team squad
The squad will be announced on September 1st

Player stats

External links
Bolivar official website

Club Bolívar seasons
Club Bolivar